Vellore Lok Sabha constituency is one of the 39 Lok Sabha (parliamentary) constituencies in the present state of Tamil Nadu in Southern India. Its Tamil Nadu Parliamentary Constituency number is 8.

The 2019 lok sabha election was scheduled to be held on 18 April in this constituency but the President of India rescinded polling on 16 April after Election Commission of India sent a report stating recovery of huge amount of unaccounted cash allegedly from Dravida Munnetra Kazhagam candidate's office.

Assembly segments
After delimitation and from 2009 Indian general election the constituency is composed of following legislative assembly segments:

Vellore Lok Sabha constituency was composed of the following legislative assembly (Vidhan Sabha) segments since 1951–52 Indian general election until delimitation in 2008:
Vellore
Katpadi
Gudiyatham
Pernambut (SC)
Anaicut
Arni

Members of Parliament

Election results

General Election 2019

General Election 2014

General Election 2009

General Election 2004

 
 

Note:Pattali Makkal Katchi did not contest this seat in 2004. Instead it was contested by its United Progressive Alliance (UPA) coalition partner Dravida Munnetra Kazhagam (DMK), who won the seat. Thus, the UPA held the seat. DMK had not contested this seat in the previous 1999 elections.

References

See also
 Vellore City
Election Commission of India
 List of Constituencies of the Lok Sabha

Lok Sabha constituencies in Tamil Nadu
Vellore district